Wilmot Township may refer to the following places:

Australia
 Wilmot, Tasmania (a township)

Canada
 Wilmot Township, Ontario
 Wilmot, Nova Scotia (formerly Wilmot Township, Nova Scotia)

United States
 Wilmot Township, Ashley County, Arkansas
 Wilmot Township, Michigan
 Wilmot Township, Bradford County, Pennsylvania

See also
 Wilmot (disambiguation)
 Wilmont Township, Nobles County, Minnesota

Township name disambiguation pages